Black River is a Polish stoner rock/heavy metal band. They were formed in 2008 by Tomasz Wróblewski (bass), Dariusz Brzozowski (drums), Piotr "Kay" Wtulich (guitar), Artur "Art." Kempa (guitar), and Maciej Taff (vocals).

In 2009, the band was nominated to Fryderyk, an annual award in Polish music.

According to an interview on 9 February 2014, Wróblewski revealed the band's hiatus since 2010 was permanent due to problems with vocalist Taff's health. However, on 16 July 2018, it was announced the band had reunited and was in the studio recording their upcoming third album, due in 2019. The band released Humanoid on 12 April 2019. 

On 2 June 2022, the band announced their new album, Generation aXe, would be released on 24 June.

Discography

Studio albums

Compilation albums

Music videos

References

External links 

 Black River official website

Polish musical groups
Polish heavy metal musical groups
Polish stoner rock musical groups
Musical groups established in 2008
Mystic Production artists
Musical quintets